These page shows the results of the Gymnastics Competition at the 1999 Pan American Games, held from July 24 to July 27 in Winnipeg, Manitoba, Canada.

Medal table

Artistic gymnastics

Men's competition
All-Around
Held on 1999-07-25

Floor Exercise
Held on 1999-07-27

Parallel Bars
Held on 1999-07-27

Pommel Horse
Held on 1999-07-27

Rings
Held on 1999-07-27

Horizontal Bar
Held on 1999-07-27

Vault
Held on 1999-07-27

Team
Held on 1999-07-24

Women's competition
All-Around
Held on 1999-07-25

Floor Exercise
Held on 1999-07-27

Uneven Bars
Held on 1999-07-27

Balance Beam
Held on 1999-07-27

Vault
Held on 1999-07-27

Team
Held on 1999-07-24

Rhythmic gymnastics

See also
Pan American Gymnastics Championships
South American Gymnastics Championships
Gymnastics at the 2000 Summer Olympics

References
 Sports 123
 Results

P
1999